Johnny Tadlock is an American politician who served as a Republican member of the Oklahoma House of Representatives from the 1st district, which includes most of McCurtain county.

Career 
Prior to running for state legislature, Tadlock served as sheriff of McCurtain County since 2005.

Tadlock defeated Kent Hendon in the Democratic primary election on June 24, 2014. The general election was held on November 4, 2014, with Tadlock winning over Republican candidate J.P. Longacre.

In 2018, he switched his party affiliation from Democratic to Republican.

In 2020, while not yet termed-out, he decided not to run for reelection. He was succeeded by Republican Eddy Dempsey.

References

Living people
Oklahoma sheriffs
Democratic Party members of the Oklahoma House of Representatives
People from Idabel, Oklahoma
21st-century American politicians
Republican Party members of the Oklahoma House of Representatives
Year of birth missing (living people)
American politicians who switched parties